The Mercedes-Benz M142 engine is a naturally-aspirated, 3.2-liter to 3.4-liter, straight-6, internal combustion piston engine, designed, developed and produced by Mercedes-Benz; between 1937 and 1942.

Applications
Mercedes-Benz W142
Mercedes-Benz 320A

References

Mercedes-Benz engines
Straight-six engines
Engines by model
Gasoline engines by model